HEHC is an abbreviation that can refer to, among others, the following:
High-efficiency hybrid cycle – thermodynamic cycle
High-Explosive, High-Capacity – military shell type